The men's hammer throw event at the 2007 World Championships in Athletics took place on 25 August 2007 (qualification) and 27 August 2007 (final) at the Nagai Stadium in Osaka, Japan.

Medallists

Schedule
All times are Japan Standard Time (UTC+9)

Abbreviations
All results shown are in metres

Records

Qualification

Group A

Group B

Final

See also
2007 in hammer throw

References
Official results, qualification - IAAF.org
Official results, final - IAAF.org
Event report - IAAF.org
 hammerthrow.wz

Hammer throw
Hammer throw at the World Athletics Championships